Grove Mall (originally The Grove Mall of Namibia) is the largest shopping centre in Namibia, Southern Africa, billed as the country's first regional shopping mall. It is located in the Hilltop mixed-use estate in Kleine Kuppe, in the southern Windhoek suburbs. It has  of gross leasable area, anchored by Checkers (supermarket), Game (hypermarket), Edgars (department store), Woolworths' 9th store in the country, Ster Kinekor cinemas, and SPAR (supermarket). Other well-known South African and international chains present include Truworths, Ackermans, Zara, Cotton On, Dis-Chem pharmacy, and Sportsmans Warehouse. It had 120 stores and restaurants in all upon opening in October 2014, of which 28 were new to Namibia. It cost 1 billion Namibian dollars to build.

References

Shopping malls in Namibia
Buildings and structures in Windhoek
Shopping malls established in 2014